Płoty  (formerly ) is a town in Gryfice County, West Pomeranian Voivodeship, Poland, with 4,035 inhabitants (2010).

Notable people 
 Fritz Köpke (1902–1991) a German athlete, competed in the men's high jump at the 1928 Summer Olympics

International relations

Płoty is twinned with:
  Niebüll, Germany

See also
History of Pomerania

External links
 Official town website

Cities and towns in West Pomeranian Voivodeship
Gryfice County